Rocky Point may refer to:

Antarctica
 Rocky Point (Antarctica), Ross Island

Australia
 Rocky Point, New South Wales
 Rocky Point, Queensland (Douglas Shire)
 Rocky Point, Queensland (Weipa Town)
 High Rocky Point in Tasmania
 Low Rocky Point in Tasmania

Canada
 Rocky Point, in Metchosin, Greater Victoria, British Columbia
 Rocky Point, Prince Edward Island
 Rocky Point Park, in Port Moody, British Columbia

Jamaica
 Rocky Point, Jamaica

Mexico
 Puerto Peñasco, Sonora, a beach resort which erroneously translates as Rocky Point in English

United States
 Rocky Point, California (disambiguation), several places
 Rocky Point (Tampa), a neighborhood within the city of Tampa, Florida
 Rocky Point (Massachusetts), a peninsula in Plymouth, Massachusetts
 Rocky Point, Montana
 Rocky Point, Montana (ghost town)
 Olive, Montana, also called Rocky Point
 Rocky Point, New York
 Rocky Point, Oregon
 Rocky Point, Cowlitz County, Washington
 Rocky Point, Kitsap County, Washington
 Rocky Point Amusement Park, a former amusement park in Warwick, Rhode Island
 Rocky Point State Park, a state park in Warwick, Rhode Island
 Rocky Point Park and Beach, a state park in Essex, Maryland